Cattleya schilleriana is a species of bifoliate Cattleya orchid.

It is endemic to Bahia state in coastal eastern Brazil.

Today it is considered extinct in nature.

Natural hybrids 
 Cattleya × undulata ( = C. elongata × C. schilleriana) (Brazil).

References

External links

schilleriana
schilleriana
Endemic orchids of Brazil
Orchids of Bahia
Critically endangered flora of South America
Plants extinct in the wild